The 1997–98 West Midlands (Regional) League season was the 98th in the history of the West Midlands (Regional) League, an English association football competition for semi-professional and amateur teams based in the West Midlands county, Shropshire, Herefordshire, Worcestershire and southern Staffordshire.

Premier Division

The Premier Division featured 16 clubs which competed in the division last season, along with two new clubs, promoted from Division One South:
Bustleholme
Kington Town

League table

References

External links

1997–98
9